Weinmannia jelskii is a species of plant in the family Cunoniaceae endemic to Peru.

References

jelskii
Endemic flora of Peru
Trees of Peru
Vulnerable flora of South America
Taxonomy articles created by Polbot